Ave crux, spes unica is a Latin pious expression or motto meaning "Hail to the Cross, our only hope."  The expression has a long history in Catholic and Anglican piety and is a motto occasionally used by bishops and church institutions. It is the motto of the Congregation of Holy Cross, Edith Stein, and of Cardinal Daniel DiNardo.

Notable uses
It is found inscribed on the back of the Processional Crucifix in the Church of SS. Peter and Paul, in the village of Yattendon, Berkshsire, England. The inscription forms the shape of a cross, with OCRVXAVE downward and SPESVNICA forming the cross piece. The two share the "V" in the middle.

"Spes Unica" is also the inscription under the Cross at the summit of the facade of the Basilica of St. Paul Outside the Walls, one of Rome's four major basilicas. "Ave Spes Unica" is inscribed on the base of the central crucifix atop the tabernacle of the main altar in the Church of St. Lazarus in Bethany, Palestine.

The American novelist, Edith Wharton, chose this inscription for her gravestone at Versailles.

Origins 
The origins are thought to be a stanza added in the tenth century to an ancient Roman hymn to the True Cross of Christ, Vexilla Regis. This sixth stanza is as follows:

which roughly translates:

O hail the cross our only hope
in this passiontide
grant increase of grace to believers
and remove the sins of the guilty.

References

Latin religious words and phrases
Congregation of Holy Cross
Latin-language Christian hymns